Anita: Swedish Nymphet is a 1973 erotic drama film written and directed by Torgny Wickman, starring Christina Lindberg, Stellan Skarsgård, Per Mattsson, Ewert Granholm and Arne Ragneborn.

Plot
This erotic tale centers on the alluring Anita, whose search for love leads to an empty life of nymphomania. Anita's self-destructive path takes a new turn when she meets college student Erik, who tries to help her overcome her addiction. Erik plays the role of counselor as Anita slowly reveals her troubled past, but will his prescription of ultimate ecstasy really cure her?

Cast
 Christina Lindberg as Anita
 Stellan Skarsgård as Erik
 Danièle Vlaminck as Anita's mother
 Michel David as Anita's father
 Per Mattsson as artist
 Ewert Granholm as the glasser
 Arne Ragneborn as man at library
 Jörgen Barwe as Lundbaeck
 Ericka Wickman as Anita's twin sister (daughter of director Torgny Wickman)
 Berit Agedahl as Lesbian social worker
 Jan-Olof Rydqvist as school teacher
 Thore Segelström as school teacher
 Lasse Lundberg as man at railway station

Production
The film was made in Stockholm, Katrineholm and the church in Vadsbro with its two towers.

Reception
A retrospective review from Scoopy.com declared: "Because of its serious treatment of nymphomania as a disease, Anita is not at all erotic".

Distribution
Because of its explicit nature, the film was banned in Norway and New Zealand.

See also
 Lolita
 Nymphomaniac

References

External links
 
 
 

1973 films
1973 drama films
1973 LGBT-related films
1970s erotic drama films
1970s psychological drama films
1970s Swedish-language films
Films about sex addiction
Films set in Stockholm
Films shot in Stockholm
French erotic drama films
French LGBT-related films
French psychological drama films
LGBT-related drama films
Swedish erotic drama films
Swedish LGBT-related films
1970s French films
1970s Swedish films